This list of frigate classes includes all post–World War II frigate classes listed alphabetically. See also List of frigate classes by country.